Chionanthus polygamus is a tree in the family Oleaceae. The specific epithet polygamus refers to the tree having both unisexual and bisexual flowers.

Description
Its bark is grey. The flowers are yellow green or creamy white.

Distribution and habitat
Chionanthus polygamus is native to an area from Sumatra east to New Guinea. Its habitat is forests to  altitude.

References

polygamus
Trees of Malesia
Trees of New Guinea
Plants described in 2002